Hilkka Kemppi (born 19 May 1988 in Asikkala) is a Finnish politician currently serving in the Parliament of Finland for the Centre Party at the Tavastia constituency.

References

1988 births
Living people
People from Asikkala
Centre Party (Finland) politicians
Members of the Parliament of Finland (2019–23)
Women members of the Parliament of Finland
21st-century Finnish women politicians